Lynch's Colombian tree frog (Hyloscirtus lynchi) is a species of frog in the family Hylidae endemic to Colombia. Its natural habitats are subtropical or tropical moist montane forests and rivers. Scientists have seen it between 2540 and 2700 meters above sea level. It is threatened by habitat loss.

References

Hyloscirtus
Amphibians of Colombia
Amphibians of the Andes
Amphibians described in 1991
Taxonomy articles created by Polbot